Kaoru Ohno  (大野 芳 Ōno Kaoru, born 10 August 1941) is a Japanese non-fiction writer.

Biography 
Ohno was born in Aichi Prefecture and graduated from the Meiji University School of Law. He worked for a publishing company and as a magazine reporter before becoming a full-time author. In 1982, in the first annual Ushio Awards, his book Kitabari took the Special Prize in Nonfiction. Kodansha published his first novel, Hungary Bukyoku wo Mouichido, in 1989. He has written several books related to Japanese military history, with particular focus on the World War II era.

Bibliography 
Kitabari (Ushio, 1982/ Chobunko, 1985)
1984-nen no Tokkōki (Asahishinbunsha, 1984)
Hangaria Bukyoku wo Mouichido (Kodansha, 1989)
Senkan Yamato Tenshisu (Shinchosha, 1993)
Zekkai Misshitsu (Shinchosha, 1998)
Konoe Hidemaro (Kondansha, 2006)
Shi ni Zama ni Miru Shyōwashi (Heibonsha Shinsho, 2010)
8-gatsu 17-nichi, Sorengun Jyōrikusu (Shinchosha, 2008/ Shinchosha, 2010)
Tokumukan 'Shyūkoku' no Shyōwashi (Shinchosha, 2009)　
Tenno no Angō (Gakken Kenkusha, 2011)

Translations 
Cage on the Sea (Bento Books, 2014)

References

Bungei Nenkan (2010)　

1941 births
Living people
Japanese non-fiction writers
20th-century Japanese writers
21st-century Japanese writers
Japanese male writers
Writers from Aichi Prefecture
Meiji University alumni
Male non-fiction writers